Melvyn Machin (born 16 April 1945) is an English former football player and manager.

A midfielder, he started his career at Port Vale in 1962, before he moved on to Gillingham four years later. He made his name at the club from 1966 to 1970, before he transferred to Bournemouth & Boscombe Athletic for a three-year spell. In 1974, he signed with Norwich City, also playing on loan at American club Seattle Sounders, before he retired in 1978 – he was later voted into Norwich City's Hall of Fame in 2002.

Appointed manager of Manchester City in 1987, he won them promotion out of the Second Division in 1988–89, before he left to take up the reins at Barnsley. In September 1994 he was appointed manager at Bournemouth, where he would remain for the next six years, managing them to a Football League Trophy final in 1998. He later served Bournemouth as Director of football between 2000 and 2002, before briefly managing Huddersfield Town in 2003.

Playing career
Despite being a Stoke City fan, Machin started his playing career at nearby Port Vale, signing professional forms in July 1962. He made the odd appearance from October 1962 and 1964, after which point he started to appear rather more frequently. He was not a favourite with Stanley Matthews or trainer Lol Hamlett as he had a habit of talking back to the pair, so he put in a transfer request in 1966. In all competitions he made 32 appearances, scoring 6 goals, being utilised mostly as an inside-forward.

In July 1966 he joined Gillingham, where he attained regular first team football. After 156 league matches and 11 goals, Machin was signed in 1970 by Bournemouth & Boscombe Athletic, at the time managed by John Bond.

His spell at Bournemouth ended after 110 appearances in December 1973, when he followed Bond to Norwich City, despite interest from Tottenham Hotspur and Crystal Palace. Converted to a full-back role, Machin played 117 appearances and scored four times for the club. He conceded a penalty in the 1975 League Cup Final defeat to Aston Villa at Wembley Stadium, handling on the line to prevent a headed goal from Chris Nicholl. After problems with injuries he finished his career in 1978, following a brief spell in the NASL with Seattle Sounders, in which time he was named in the NASL All-Stars team.

Coaching and management career
After retiring as a player, Norwich then invited him to join their coaching set-up. He worked as youth team and reserve team coach, and then was promoted to chief coach before being appointed as assistant to manager Ken Brown. The partnership finished in May 1987, when he accepted an offer to manage Manchester City.

After two seasons in charge, he got the club promoted to Division One with a young and promising squad. In the first season in the top-flight, his team beat local rivals Manchester United by 5–1 on 23 September 1989, in what Alex Ferguson described as the lowest point of his career. Despite the victory, two months later, on 27 November, Machin was sacked by chairman Peter Swales as the club was bottom of the division. He became Barnsley manager on 29 December but resigned on 5 May 1993, as he was disillusioned with the club policy of selling their best players to make ends meet.

Machin then worked as a scout for West Ham United, Tottenham Hotspur and Liverpool before he was appointed manager of Bournemouth in September 1994. In his first season at the helm he managed to keep the club in the Second Division despite a start with seven consecutive defeats and a serious financial crisis, this feat later became known as "The Great Escape". In 1998, Bournemouth lost to Grimsby Town in the Football League Trophy final in their first ever Wembley appearance. In August 2000, he became director of football role and later retired on 29 August 2002, having had his testimonial match the previous month. It was in his testimonial – a 3–2 victory for Manchester United, that United's £29.3 million signing Rio Ferdinand made his debut. In October 2002 he was linked to the vacant management position at Swindon Town.

On 28 January 2003, Machin came out of retirement to assist Mick Wadsworth at the helm of Huddersfield Town. Two months later he was promoted to the manager role as Wadsworth was sacked. Machin and Huddersfield parted ways at the end of the season as he failed to avoid relegation to the Third Division.

Career statistics

Playing statistics
Source:

Managerial statistics
Source:

Honours

Playing career
Norwich City
Football League Cup runner-up: 1975

Individual
PFA Third Division Team of the Year: 1973–74
NASL All-Stars: 1977

Managerial career
Manchester City
Football League Second Division second-place promotion: 1988–89

AFC Bournemouth
Football League Trophy runner-up: 1998

References

1945 births
Living people
Sportspeople from Newcastle-under-Lyme
English footballers
Association football midfielders
Port Vale F.C. players
Gillingham F.C. players
AFC Bournemouth players
Norwich City F.C. players
English expatriate footballers
Expatriate soccer players in the United States
English expatriate sportspeople in the United States
Seattle Sounders (1974–1983) players
English Football League players
North American Soccer League (1968–1984) players
English football managers
Manchester City F.C. managers
Barnsley F.C. managers
AFC Bournemouth managers
Huddersfield Town A.F.C. managers
English Football League managers
Association football coaches
Association football scouts
Norwich City F.C. non-playing staff
West Ham United F.C. non-playing staff
Tottenham Hotspur F.C. non-playing staff
Liverpool F.C. non-playing staff
AFC Bournemouth non-playing staff
Huddersfield Town A.F.C. non-playing staff